The Knight in Black is a c.1567 oil on canvas portrait painting of an unknown male subject by Giovanni Battista Moroni, now in the Museo Poldi Pezzoli in Milan.

History
The first written reference to the work shows it was probably in Secco Suardo's collection with other portraits produced for his family by the same artist. At the end of the 18th century it was still in the family, namely with Caterina Terzi Secco Suardo in Bergamo, shortly before passing to Barbara Secco Suardo Mosconi of the same city and then to the latter's husband Giovanni Mosconi. In 1845 it was left to the Moroni counts in Bergamo, before being acquired by Luciano Scotti, son of Giulia Casanova and Annibale Scotti. In 1952 it was moved to Milan, where it remained for ten years before being donated to its present owner.

References

1567 paintings
16th-century portraits
Portraits of men
Paintings by Giovanni Battista Moroni
Paintings in the collection of the Museo Poldi Pezzoli